Brinker Run is a  long 2nd order tributary to Sewickley Creek in Westmoreland County, Pennsylvania.

Course
Brinker Run rises about 0.25 miles northwest of Humphreys, Pennsylvania, and then flows southwest to join Sewickley Creek at United.

Watershed
Brinker Run drains  of area, receives about 42.9 in/year of precipitation, has a wetness index of 367.95, and is about 43% forested.

References

 
Tributaries of the Ohio River
Rivers of Pennsylvania
Rivers of Westmoreland County, Pennsylvania
Allegheny Plateau